The  is a national expressway in Japan. It is owned and operated by West Nippon Expressway Company. It is signed as E27 under the Ministry of Land, Infrastructure, Transport and Tourism's "2016 Proposal for Realization of Expressway Numbering."

Route description
Officially the expressway is referred to as the Kinki Expressway Tsuruga Route. This designation applies to the Maizuru-Wakasa Expressway as well as the Chūgoku Expressway beyond Yokawa Junction to Suita Junction.

The route of the expressway connects the coastline of the Japan Sea and the greater Osaka urban area by traversing the mountainous interior of the Kinki region.

Using the expressway to travel between the Chūgoku Expressway, Sanyō Expressway and Hokuriku Expressway is shorter and cheaper than using expressways that traverse a route via the greater Osaka urban area.

The expressway is 4 lanes from Yokawa Junction to Fukuchiyama Interchange and Ayabe Interchange to Ayabe Parking Area and the remainder is 2 lanes. Construction to expand the route to 4 lanes is currently underway on the section between Fukuchiyama Interchange and Ayabe Interchange and Ayabe Parking Area and Maizuru-Nishi Interchange. The speed limit is 80 km/h on 4-laned sections and 70 km/h on 2-laned sections.

History
The first section of the expressway was opened to traffic in 1987 and the entire route was completed in 2014.

List of interchanges and features

 IC - interchange, SIC - smart interchange, JCT - junction, SA - service area, PA - parking area, BS - bus stop, TN - tunnel, BR - bridge

References

External links
 Central Nippon Expressway Company
 West Nippon Expressway Company

Expressways in Japan
Roads in Fukui Prefecture
Roads in Hyōgo Prefecture
Roads in Kyoto Prefecture